Meera Khadka is a Nepalese Judge. She is currently a justice of the Supreme Court of Nepal.

Awards
 Aishwarya Bidhya Padak on 5 June 1979
 Suprabal Gorkha Dakshina Bahu Third on 29 December 1994
 Suprabal Jana Sewa Shree Third on 29 May 2014

See also
 Deepak Raj Joshee
 Gopal Prasad Parajuli

References

External links
 Supreme Court of Nepal

Living people
Justices of the Supreme Court of Nepal
1957 births
Nepalese Hindus